Beverley Ussher may refer to:
 Beverley Ussher (MP) (c. 1700–1757), Irish member of Parliament
 Beverley Ussher (architect) (1868–1908), Australian architect